Jerome Joseph Kohl (November 27, 1946 – August 4, 2020) was an American musicologist, academic journal editor, and recorder teacher. A music theorist at the University of Washington, he became recognized internationally as an authority on the music of Karlheinz Stockhausen.

Life and work 
Kohl grew up in Lincoln, Nebraska, with three siblings. During high school and college, he played the clarinet in the local symphony orchestra. He received his undergraduate, and in 1971, his master's degree in music from the University of Nebraska. Drafted into the army, he played in an army band during the Vietnam War. Afterwards, he started his doctoral studies in music theory at the University of Washington in Seattle. In the 1970s, Kohl joined the Seattle Recorder Society, attending and running classes at their meetings, as well as teaching privately. In 1976, Kohl co-founded and became the board president of the Early Music Guild (EMG, now called Early Music Seattle) in Seattle, attracting international players to perform in the city. The EMG held a monthly concert by local players, and in 1980, Kohl played a concert with music from the 14th century to modern times. He continued to teach recorder for the Society for decades.

Kohl concluded his studies in 1981 with his PhD thesis, titled "Serial and Non-Serial Techniques in the Music of Karlheinz Stockhausen from 1962–1968". He was managing editor of the journal Perspectives of New Music from 1985 to 1999. Between 2005 and 2018, he was Secretary of the Department of Classics at the University of Washington. In 2018, Kohl became Administrative Assistant at the university's Department of Political Science.

His research focus was contemporary classical music. He became recognized as a world expert on the works of Karlheinz Stockhausen, taking part in international conferences on his music. He collaborated with Stockhausen, traveling to Europe annually, and co-authored books with him. Kohl was also a contributor on Wikipedia, with more than 100,000 edits, creating many articles, especially about the works of Stockhausen.

Kohl died in Seattle from a sudden heart attack, on August 4, 2020, at the age of 73. His death was commemorated by a memorial tribute in Perspectives of New Music, which described his 2017 book on Stockhausen's Zeitmaße as "an astounding masterpiece".

Publications

References

External links 
 Jerome Kohl, ResearchGate
 Jerome Kohl, Semantic Scholar

1946 births
2020 deaths
Writers from Lincoln, Nebraska
Military personnel from Nebraska
University of Nebraska–Lincoln alumni
University of Washington alumni
University of Washington staff
American music theorists
American Wikimedians